Dumitru Pascu (25 February 1945 – 1995) was a Romanian bobsledder. He competed in the four man event at the 1972 Winter Olympics.

References

1945 births
1995 deaths
Romanian male bobsledders
Olympic bobsledders of Romania
Bobsledders at the 1972 Winter Olympics
People from Sinaia